Lake Dardanelle State Park is located on two sites on the lake, one in Russellville, Arkansas and one in Dardanelle, Arkansas, on the 34,300-acre Lake Dardanelle. Both sites include picnic facilities, boat ramps, pavilions, playgrounds and dump stations.

The Russellville Area site features a  visitor center with six aquariums, natural and cultural history displays, classrooms and a gift shop. The Visitor Center is open daily from 10 AM to 5 PM, year round. There is a fishing tournament weigh-in pavilion that is used for the many fishing tournaments held at the park. Nearby, there is  a covered, barrier-free fishing pier. There are 74 campsites and an outdoor amphitheater. The Dardanelle Area site features 18 camp sites.

The park's staff offer many interpretive programs, including guided hikes, nature talks, kayaking, lake tours and demonstrations, evening slide shows and movies.

Notes

References

Arkansas Heritage Trails System
Protected areas of Pope County, Arkansas
Protected areas of Yell County, Arkansas
Russellville, Arkansas
State parks of Arkansas
Dardanelle, Arkansas